The 2020–21 NBL season was the 18th season for the New Zealand Breakers in the NBL.

Roster

Squad

Regular season

Ladder

Game log 

|-style="background:#fcc;"
| 1
| 22 January
| @ Adelaide
| L 94–91 (OT)
| Tai Webster (34)
| Finn Delany (8)
| Tai Webster (8)
| Adelaide Entertainment Centre6,589
| 0–1
|-style="background:#fcc;"
| 2
| 27 January
| @ Adelaide
| L 88–78
| Finn Delany (19)
| Colton Iverson (10)
| Tai Webster (7)
| Adelaide Entertainment Centre5,706
| 0–2

|-style="background:#cfc;"
| 3
| 6 February
| @ Cairns
| W 79–85
| Tai Webster (25)
| Tai Webster (11)
| Tai Webster (5)
| Cairns Pop-Up Arena1,891
| 1–2
|-style="background:#fcc;"
| 4
| 8 February
| @ Cairns
| L 84–69
| Tai Webster (13)
| Thomas Abercrombie (7)
| Lamar Patterson (4)
| Cairns Pop-Up Arena1,828
| 1–3
|-style="background:#fcc;"
| 5
| 12 February
| @ Sydney
| L 84–74
| Corey Webster (25)
| Iverson, T. Webster (10)
| Tai Webster (4)
| Qudos Bank Arena5,833
| 1–4

|-style="background:#fcc;"
| 6
| 22 February
| @ Illawarra
| L 102–88
| Corey Webster (22)
| Colton Iverson (17)
| Corey Webster (7)
| John Cain Arena2,313
| 1–5
|-style="background:#fcc;"
| 7
| 25 February
| @ Sydney
| L 96–78
| Corey Webster (24)
| Colton Iverson (6)
| Tai Webster (5)
| John Cain Arena1,991
| 1–6
|-style="background:#cfc;"
| 8
| 27 February
| @ Adelaide
| W 62–106
| C. Webster, T. Webster (29)
| Colton Iverson (8)
| Tai Webster (11)
| John Cain Arena4,206
| 2–6
|-style="background:#cfc;"
| 9
| 3 March
| Brisbane
| W 97–92
| Corey Webster (21)
| Tai Webster (9)
| C. Webster, T. Webster (4)
| State Basketball Centre2,257
| 3–6
|-style="background:#fcc;"
| 10
| 5 March
| Melbourne
| L 84–87
| Tai Webster (32)
| Finn Delany (9)
| Delany, C. Webster, T. Webster, Weeks (2)
| John Cain Arena3,421
| 3–7
|-style="background:#cfc;"
| 11
| 10 March
| Cairns
| W 86–83
| Thomas Abercrombie (20)
| Colton Iverson (11)
| Tai Webster (4)
| John Cain Arena3,675
| 4–7
|-style="background:#fcc;"
| 12
| 12 March
| @ Perth
| L 85–75
| Finn Delany (30)
| Colton Iverson (8)
| Tai Webster (7)
| John Cain Arena2,478
| 4–8
|-style="background:#fcc;"
| 13
| 14 March
| South East Melbourne
| L 89–103
| Finn Delany (24)
| Colton Iverson (8)
| Tai Webster (5)
| John Cain Arena4,019
| 4–9

|-style="background:#fcc;"
| 14
| 20 March
| @ Brisbane
| L 88–67
| Tai Webster (19)
| Finn Delany (9)
| Tai Webster (5)
| Nissan Arena3,386
| 4–10
|-style="background:#fcc;"
| 15
| 25 March
| Melbourne
| L 79–82
| Finn Delany (17)
| Abercrombie, T. Webster (7)
| Tai Webster (7)
| Bendigo Stadium1,150
| 4–11
|-style="background:#cfc;"
| 16
| 27 March
| @ Brisbane
| W 76–81 (OT)
| Tai Webster (27)
| Colton Iverson (20)
| Tai Webster (10)
| Nissan Arena2,935
| 5–11

|-style="background:#fcc;"
| 17
| 4 April
| @ South East Melbourne
| L 92–85
| Colton Iverson (26)
| Colton Iverson (22)
| Tai Webster (7)
| John Cain Arena1,850
| 5–12
|-style="background:#fcc;"
| 18
| 10 April
| @ Melbourne
| L 84–78
| Finn Delany (33)
| Colton Iverson (9)
| William McDowell-White (4)
| John Cain Arena2,717
| 5–13
|-style="background:#fcc;"
| 19
| 13 April
| Perth
| L 79–85 (OT)
| Finn Delany (25)
| Finn Delany (9)
| Corey Webster (8)
| Silverdome1,358
| 5–14
|-style="background:#cfc;"
| 20
| 16 April
| Brisbane
| W 91–71
| Levi Randolph (20)
| William McDowell-White (10)
| William McDowell-White (14)
| Silverdome1,559
| 6–14
|-style="background:#cfc;"
| 21
| 18 April
| @ Perth
| W 78–83
| Levi Randolph (23)
| Colton Iverson (17)
| Finn Delany (7)
| RAC Arena11,316
| 7–14
|-style="background:#fcc;"
| 22
| 23 April
| Cairns
| L 68–70
| Finn Delany (23)
| Finn Delany (14)
| Corey Webster (7)
| Silverdome1,287
| 7–15
|-style="background:#cfc;"
| 23
| 26 April
| Adelaide
| W 93–77
| Finn Delany (23)
| Colton Iverson (9)
| William McDowell-White (13)
| Silverdome893
| 8–15
|-style="background:#fcc;"
| 24
| 28 April
| @ Melbourne
| L 90–76
| Corey Webster (20)
| Finn Delany (9)
| Corey Webster (5)
| John Cain Arena2,173
| 8–16

|-style="background:#cfc;"
| 25
| 1 May
| Perth
| W 86–84
| Levi Randolph (19)
| Colton Iverson (5)
| Randolph, C. Webster, T. Webster (4)
| Silverdome1,621
| 9–16
|-style="background:#fcc;"
| 26
| 3 May
| Illawarra
| L 67–75
| Abercrombie, T. Webster (14)
| Finn Delany (9)
| Tai Webster (5)
| Silverdome1,097
| 9–17
|-style="background:#fcc;"
| 27
| 9 May
| @ Perth
| L 98–84
| Finn Delany (21)
| Tai Webster (7)
| William McDowell-White (7)
| RAC Arena10,518
| 9–18
|-style="background:#fcc;"
| 28
| 12 May
| @ South East Melbourne
| L 91–82
| Finn Delany (32)
| Colton Iverson (8)
| McDowell-White, T. Webster (4)
| John Cain Arena1,247
| 9–19
|-style="background:#fcc;"
| 29
| 15 May
| @ Illawarra
| L 73–71
| Finn Delany (20)
| Finn Delany (11)
| William McDowell-White (9)
| WIN Entertainment Centre2,456
| 9–20
|-style="background:#cfc;"
| 30
| 20 May
| Sydney
| W 89–81
| Finn Delany (28)
| Finn Delany (13)
| William McDowell-White (7)
| The Trusts Arena3,800
| 10–20
|-style="background:#fcc;"
| 31
| 22 May
| Sydney
| L 76–81
| Levi Randolph (25)
| Iverson, T. Webster (7)
| Tai Webster (5)
| TSB Stadium2,066
| 10–21
|-style="background:#cfc;"
| 32
| 25 May
| Adelaide
| W 94–76
| Corey Webster (22)
| Colton Iverson (7)
| McDowell-White, C. Webster (8)
| Christchurch Arena2,803
| 11–21
|-style="background:#fcc;"
| 33
| 28 May
| Illawarra
| 73–84
| Finn Delany (24)
| Iverson, Randolph (8)
| William McDowell-White (5)
| Franklin Pool and Leisure Centre1,100
| 11–22
|-style="background:#fcc;"
| 34
| 30 May
| Brisbane
| L 83–95
| Levi Randolph (30)
| Colton Iverson (16)
| Corey Webster (6)
| Spark Arena7,612
| 11–23

|-style="background:#cfc;"
| 35
| 2 June
| Cairns
| W 84–78
| Tai Webster (23)
| Colton Iverson (12)
| Corey Webster (4)
| Energy Events Centre2,435
| 12–23
|-style="background:#fcc;"
| 36
| 5 June
| South East Melbourne
| L 78–83
| Tai Webster (26)
| Colton Iverson (12)
| Finn Delany (4)
| The Trusts Arena3,872
| 12–24

Transactions

Re-signed

Additions

Subtractions

Awards

Player of the Week 
Round 19, Finn Delany

See also 

 2020–21 NBL season
 New Zealand Breakers

References

External links 

 Official Website

New Zealand Breakers
New Zealand Breakers seasons
New Zealand Breakers season